La Tigra  is a village and municipality located in the O'Higgins Department in Chaco Province in northern Argentina.

Notable people 
 Sergio Víctor Palma , professional boxer, WBA Super Bantamweight champion

References

Populated places in Chaco Province